Willow Springs was a water park located in Little Rock, Arkansas. It closed for swimming in July 2013. 

The park subsequently re-opened for fishing but not swimming. It closed permanently in August 2015.

History & description
It was built in 1928. Willow Springs is a sandy bottom spring and well fed lake, similar to Maywood Beach in Mississippi. Unlike most water parks, visitors could bring their own food and drinks into the park, though a restaurant called Upper Deck Café was located on site.

Season
Willow Springs was open from May through September each year.

Amoebic meningitis outbreak and closure of the park
On July 26, 2013, the owner of the park shut it down indefinitely after a swimmer was diagnosed with amoebic meningitis, 3 years after another swimmer at the park died from the same infection.  The Arkansas Department of Health determined that the park may have been at higher risk because the water is shallow and heats up faster (as the causative parasite is somewhat thermophillic).  The owner had hoped to re-open the park if it would have been financially feasible to cover the bottom with concrete, since the protist that causes the disease tends to live in the soil at the bottom of lakes.

Attractions
Family Atmosphere
400 ft Waterslide
Large Kiddie Pool and Playground Area
Lifeguards on Duty
Two Log Roll and Water Trampolines
Lifejackets Available
Covered Picnic Tables and Grills
Group pricing available
Water basketball, Volleyball, and Tetherball
Swimming Lessons Available
Horseshoe Pits
Basketball and Soccer areas

References

1928 establishments in Arkansas
Water parks in Arkansas
Buildings and structures in Little Rock, Arkansas
Tourist attractions in Little Rock, Arkansas
2013 disestablishments in Arkansas